Awadam or Avadam is a village in Mancherial district of the Indian state of Telangana. It is located in Nennal mandal. It falls under Bellampalli (Assembly constituency) and Peddapalle (Lok Sabha constituency).

Demographics 

As of 2011 census of India, Awadam has a population of 2,089. Males constitute 51% of the total population and females 49%.

The majority of people practice Hinduism, followed by Islam and Christianity. Languages spoken include Telugu, followed by Hindi and English.

Transport

Road 
Awadam is well connected by road to nearby towns like Mancherial, Mandamarri and Bellampalle. State run TSRTC buses run from Mancherial via Mandamarri.
NH 16 (Nizamabad to Jagdalpur) passes 16 km away from Awadam at Bheemaram. Rajeev Rahadari Hyderabad-Karimnagar-Ramagundam(Godavarikhani) road is 32 km away from Awadam, which is the shortest route to reach Hyderabad via Godavarikhani, Karimnagar, Siddipet. Mamidi gattu, chittapur, gangaram, kazipally are neighbouring villages of Awadam.

Rail 
Nearby railway station is Mancherial, which is located on north–south railway route from Delhi to Chennai. It comes under South Central Railways.

Air 
The nearest international airport is Rajiv Gandhi International Airport in Hyderabad, located 270 km away.

Education 
 Zilla Parishad High School is secondary education school in Awadam. This school was established in 1986. It is a co-educational institute. It serves for the classes from 6th to 10th. The primary language of education is Telugu, but now newly English medium is also introduced according to the Government of Telangana plans to introduce English medium in Government schools of Telangana.
This school is the main education source for surrounding villages like Gangaram, Mamidigattu, Chittapur, Jhandavenkatapur, Chinavenkatapur, Kottur, Pottiyal etc. This school also has a playground.

Politics 

 Seerla Sathyamma – Sarpanch, Telangana Rashtra Samithi
 Padma T – MPTC, Telangana Rashtra Samithi
 Mondi Reddy-TRS leader
 Kishan Reddy Seerla-Congress leader of Awadam

Awadam Song 
 https://www.youtube.com/watch?v=Doh4u5FtsYE

References 

Villages in Mancherial district